Earl L. Denman was born around either 1915 or 1923 in Tod Inlet on Vancouver Island but grew up in England. He was a Canadian mountaineer who attempted to climb Mount Everest in 1947. By 1947 he was working as an engineer in Southern Rhodesia.

His illegal attempt was very different from the large-scale efforts by British mountaineers around the same time. He had little experience, having only climbed the smaller Virunga mountains in East Africa before this expedition. He did not have much money, equipment, or fuel, and entered Tibet without permission. Two Sherpas (one of whom was Tenzing Norgay, later to make the first ascent of Everest) joined his attempt. Norgay later said that he knew Denman had little chance of succeeding, but that he agreed to join Denman because "the pull of Everest was stronger for me than any force on earth." After a trekking across Tibet, Denman and the two Sherpas started their ascent on April 9, 1947.

Denman tried to return to Everest in 1948, but couldn't leave India. In 1954 his autobiography Alone to Everest of his Everest attempt was published. Later he fought Apartheid in South Africa, where he was living in the 1960s before he was thrown out of the country. In 1982 he was living in New Zealand.

References

Sources
 Alone to Everest, by Earl Denman, Collins, 1954, pp. 256
 Everest, by Walt Unsworth
 Tiger of the Snows/Man of Everest, by Tenzing Norgay and James Ramsey Ullman
 Into Thin Air, beginning of Chapter 7, by Jon Krakauer

External links 
Everest History (1947)

Canadian mountain climbers
Year of birth missing
Possibly living people